Sutor is a surname. Notable people with the surname include:

Emil Sutor (1888–1974), German sculptor
George Sutor (1943–2011), American basketball player
Hans Sutor (1895–1976), German footballer
Jacob Sutor (17th century), German fencing master
John Sutor (1909–1966), English cricketer
Joshua Sutor (born 1999), German curler
June Sutor (1929–1990), New Zealand-born crystallographer 
Russell Sutor (1951–1995), Canadian businessman and politician
Uli Sutor (born 1960), German curler and coach